The Rural Municipality of Rosedale No. 283 is a rural municipality (RM) in the Canadian province of Saskatchewan within Census Division No. 11 and  Division No. 5. It is located in the central portion of the province along Highway 11 between Saskatoon and Regina.

History 
The RM of Rosedale No. 283 incorporated as a rural municipality on December 13, 1909. It was formed through the amalgamation of Local Improvement District (LID) 15-B-3 and LID 15-C-3.

Geography

Communities and localities 
The following urban municipalities are surrounded by the RM.

Towns
 Hanley

The following unincorporated communities are within the RM.

Localities
 Jays

Demographics 

Government 
The RM of Rosedale No. 283 is governed by an elected municipal council and an appointed administrator that meets on the second Tuesday of every month. The reeve of the RM is Nick Patkau while its administrator is Danielle Hache. The RM's office is located in Hanley.

Transportation 
Rail
Regina Branch C.N.R—serves Davidson, Bladworth, Kenaston, Strong, Hanley, Indi, Dundurn, Strehlow, Haultain, Grasswood, Nutana, Saskatoon

Roads
Highway 11—serves Hanley, Saskatchewan
Highway 764—serves Hanley, Saskatchewan
Highway 15—located between Hanley, Saskatchewan and Hawarden, Saskatchewan runs east-west
Highway 19—serves Hawarden, Saskatchewan

See also 
List of rural municipalities in Saskatchewan

References 

Rosedale